Solarino (Sicilian: San Paulu) is a comune (municipality) in the Province of Syracuse, Sicily (Italy).

Solarino borders the following municipalities: Floridia, Palazzolo Acreide, Priolo Gargallo, Syracuse, Sortino.

Demographic evolution

Sister cities
  New Britain, (United States).
  Brunswick - Merri-bek, (Australia).

Photogallery

References

External links
 www.solarino.it/

Cities and towns in Sicily